Fluacizine, sold under the brand name Phtorazisin, is a tricyclic antidepressant (TCA) of the phenothiazine group which is or was marketed in Russia. Unlike other phenothiazines, fluacizine is not an antipsychotic, and can actually reverse catalepsy and extrapyramidal symptoms induced by antidopaminergic agents like antipsychotics, reserpine, and tetrabenazine as well as potentiate amphetamine-induced stereotypy. It is known to act as a norepinephrine reuptake inhibitor, antihistamine, and anticholinergic. The drug was developed in the 1960s and was marketed in the 1970s. It is the trifluoromethyl analogue of chloracizine.

See also
 Pipofezine

References

Abandoned drugs
Diethylamino compounds
Antidepressants
Carboxamides
Drugs in the Soviet Union
H1 receptor antagonists
Muscarinic antagonists
Norepinephrine reuptake inhibitors
Phenothiazines
Russian drugs
Trifluoromethyl compounds